Tan Chin Tuan (21 November 1908 – 13 November 2005) was a Peranakan banker and philanthropist often credited with helping to establish the OCBC Bank.

Biography

Early life 
Born in 1908, he was the son of prominent Hokkien businessman, Tan Cheng Siong, a General Manager of Oversea-Chinese Bank Ltd. Tan Chin Tuan grew up under the harsh conditions of the Great Depression (1930), having lost his father during his schooling years.  Educated at Anglo-Chinese School, he was compelled to leave school at the age of seventeen to begin work at the Chinese Commercial Bank (which merged with Ho Hong Bank that same year to form OCBC).

Career 
Tan served as the managing director of OCBC from 1942 to 1972 and as chairman from 1966 to 1983. Upon his retirement, he was made honorary life president of the bank, the only person ever thus honoured.

Tan established his reputation as a sharp corporate banker with a keen eye for spotting opportunities to create value for the bank and its shareholders.  His ideas and thinking were instrumental in the building of OCBC bank.

Between the mid-1950s to the mid-1970s, he was chairman of ten blue-chip companies.  Upon his retirement of these companies, Tan was made their Honorary Life President.

Philanthropist 
Tan Chin Tuan was a strong advocate of lifelong learning. In 1984, he donated £350,000 to the Needham Research Institute (NRI) in Cambridge, United Kingdom and the library block at NRI is named after him.  NRI is currently one of the top three centres for learning Chinese science and technology in the world.  In 1997, he committed S$2.5 million towards the Nanyang Technological University's exchange programme in engineering. Named the Tan Chin Tuan Exchange Fellowship, it funds research collaborations between NTU and overseas institutes.

Tan established the Tan Chin Tuan Foundation (TCTF) on 10 April 1976 to share with society the rewards of his highly illustrious career. He rendered assistance to the deserving and provided services that helped uplift the less fortunate. Today, the contributions of TCTF reflect the founder’s philosophy of how money should be channelled for social good. The foundation strives to support causes and projects that are viable, sustainable and well-managed with definable social outcomes.

Today, TCTF continues his commitment towards advancing educational causes through professorships, scholarships and bursaries, and establishing strategic programmes in institutions of higher learning.

Awards 
 Tan was awarded the prestigious Commander of the Most Excellent Order of the British Empire for his contributions during his service in the Legislative Council in 1951
 His title of Tan Sri was conferred to him by Malaysia's Yang Di Pertuan Agong Sultan Tuanku Ismail Nasiruddin Shah (Supreme Head of State) of Malaysia on 31 August 1969.
 Tan was conferred an honorary Doctor of Laws by the late Singapore President Wee Kim Wee, who was the Chancellor of the National University of Singapore at its Convocation on 3 September 1991.
 In 1992, Curtin University of Technology, Australia honoured Tan with an honorary doctorate in appreciation of his long personal and professional ties with Australia.

Honour

Foreign honour
  : 
 Honorary Commander of the Order of Loyalty to the Crown of Malaysia (P.S.M.) – Tan Sri (1969)

References 

1908 births
2005 deaths
20th-century Singaporean businesspeople
Peranakan people in Singapore
Honorary Commanders of the Order of Loyalty to the Crown of Malaysia
Anglo-Chinese School alumni